American Samoa competed at the 2016 Summer Olympics in Rio de Janeiro, Brazil, from 5 to 21 August 2016. This was the nation's eighth consecutive appearance at the Summer Olympics.

Four American Samoan athletes, three men and one woman, were selected for the Games, competing only in athletics, judo, and weightlifting; all of them made their Olympic debut in Rio de Janeiro through wild card entries and universality places, without having qualified. Among the nation's athletes were American-born sprinters Isaac Silafau and Jordan Mageo (the lone female of the team), lightweight judoka Benjamin Waterhouse (men's 73 kg), and weightlifter Tanumafili Jungblut, who led the delegation as American Samoa's flag bearer in the opening ceremony. American Samoa, however, has yet to win its first ever Olympic medal.

Athletics

American Samoa has received universality slots from IAAF to send two athletes (one male and one female) to the Olympics.

Track & road events

Judo

American Samoa has qualified one judoka for the men's lightweight category (73 kg) at the Games. Benjamin Waterhouse earned a continental quota spot from the Oceania region as the nation's lone judoka outside of direct qualifying position in the IJF World Ranking List of May 30, 2016.

Weightlifting
 
American Samoa has received an invitation from the Tripartite Commission to send Tanumafili Jungblut in the men's middle-heavyweight category (94 kg) to the Olympics, signifying the nation's Olympic return to the sport for the first time since 2004.

References

External links 
 

Olympics
2016
Nations at the 2016 Summer Olympics